Genotina genotae is a species of sea snail, a marine gastropod mollusk in the family Mangeliidae.

Description
The shell of the adult snail grows to a length of 22 mm.

Distribution
Genotina adamii is a demersal sea snail living off the Philippines.

References

 Vera-Peláez. 2004. Genotina genotae new species and new genus and Genota nigeriensis new species of the subfamily Conorbiinae (Gastropoda, Turridae). Systematic, biogeography, stratigraphy and phylogeny of Conorbis, Genotina and Genota genera. Pliocenica, 4 : 95–106

External links
 

genotae
Gastropods described in 2004